Thomas Rogers Kimball (April 19, 1862 – September 7, 1934) was an American architect in Omaha, Nebraska. An architect-in-chief of the Trans-Mississippi Exposition in Omaha in 1898, he served as national President of the American Institute of Architects from 1918–1920 and from 1919-1932 served on the Nebraska State Capitol Commission.

Kimball was credited with pursuing 871 commissions, which included designing 167 new residential buildings and 162 new non-residential structures, served as architectural adviser to commissions responsible for erection of Missouri and Nebraska state capitols, the Kansas City Liberty Memorial, and the Indiana state war memorial in Indianapolis, and was member of national council of fine arts established by U.S. President Theodore Roosevelt to evaluate all plans for public buildings, monuments, and statutes.

Biography

Born April 19, 1862 in Linwood, Cincinnati, Ohio, he moved to Omaha, Nebraska with his parents when he was in his early teens. After graduating from high school in 1878, he attended the University of Nebraska (currently the University of Nebraska-Lincoln) for two years, but did not graduate. He next went to Boston, where he worked with a private tutor for another two years. Kimball then entered the Massachusetts Institute of Technology, where he studied architecture until 1887. He did not graduate, but was later given an affiliation with the School of Architecture.

Kimball then moved to Paris, where he spent a year studying art at L'Ecole des Beaux Arts. Returning to Boston in 1888, he began working for a publishing company. The following year, Kimball married Annie McPhail in Boston.

Walker and Kimball
In 1891, Kimball formed an architectural firm with MIT instructor C. Howard Walker and architect Herbert Best. Best soon retired. Walker remained in Boston to run the office there; Kimball moved back to Omaha and opened an office. Both operated under the name Walker and Kimball. In 1892, Kimball was commissioned to design a public library building in Omaha. Although Kimball had been able to get the job through connections established by his father, railroad executive Thomas Lord Kimball, the younger Kimball was in fact well qualified for the work. He was also something of a curiosity in 1890s Omaha, since he had been educated in the East and had studied architecture both in the United States and in France. Kimball began attracting many high-profile projects in Omaha, including St. Frances Cabrini Church and the Burlington Train Station. In 1893, some of his architectural plans were shown in Chicago at the World Columbian Exposition.

Trans-Mississippi Exposition
The 1898 Trans Mississippi and International Exposition was a World's Fair-like event that required the construction of many buildings. Kimball and Walker were named co-architects-in-chief for the event. The two men were responsible for the overall site development, including perimeter buildings. They designed several major buildings, some smaller structures and the Arch of States (a main entrance). "The other 'name' architects who were there did a main building and nothing else," Batie said.

The buildings were constructed of strips of wood covered with staff, which was a mixture of plaster and horsehair. They were temporary by design, built at about half the cost of permanent buildings. The lower cost allowed the construction of larger structures. Kimball was already successful, but his Exhibition work made him even more so. Kimball won commissions for major new projects, such as St. Cecilia Cathedral and the Fontenelle Hotel in Omaha, and the Electricity Building at the 1904 World's Fair in St. Louis.

Late career
By 1918, he had gained tremendous stature among his peers and was elected national president of the American Institute of Architects, an office he held until 1920. Kimball was involved in many architecture-related activities, including supervision of the 1920 design contest that selected Bertram Goodhue as architect of the Nebraska State Capitol.

In 1927, Kimball went into a partnership with architects William L. Steele (1875–1949) and Josiah D. Sandham (1880–1969) to form the firm Kimball, Steele, and Sandham. Among other commissions, the firm designed the Second Church of Christ Scientist (Minneapolis, 1930) and with George B. Prinz were associate architects on the Federal Office Building (Omaha, 1933).  However, Kimball functioned primarily as a consultant, having stopped working as an active architect.

Death and legacy
Kimball's success could not survive the Great Depression, which hurt him financially.  He died a pauper in 1934. Upon his death, partner William L. Steele remarked that Kimball "did not...as the majority of his contemporaries did, absorb a repertoire of French tricks and come home. He studied architecture as building, not as merely drawings of the buildings. He seemed to have acquired at an early age that grasp of fundamental principles which was to keep him from being stampeded by passing fads."

In 2017, Kimball was selected as the 26th member of the Nebraska Hall of Fame. In 2019, he was formally inducted with the creation of a bust of his likeness to be displayed in the Nebraska State Capitol.

Notable designs

Kimball also designed the original Omaha World-Herald building, the First National Bank in Grand Island and the Hastings, Nebraska Railroad Station. At the Trans-Mississippi and International Exposition he prepared the layout for the park and designed the Arch of the States, the Administration Building, Transportation Building, and the Boys' and Girls' Building.

See also
John Latenser, Sr.
Joseph P. Guth
Architecture in Omaha, Nebraska
Omaha Landmarks

References

1862 births
1934 deaths
Architects from Cincinnati
Artists from Omaha, Nebraska
Architects from Nebraska
American alumni of the École des Beaux-Arts
Fellows of the American Institute of Architects
Presidents of the American Institute of Architects
19th-century American architects
20th-century American architects